The Grammy Award for Best Contemporary Instrumental Album (previously: Best Pop Instrumental Album) is an award presented at the Grammy Awards, a ceremony that was established in 1958 and originally called the Gramophone Awards, to recording artists for quality instrumental albums in the pop music genre. Honors in several categories are presented at the ceremony annually by the National Academy of Recording Arts and Sciences of the United States to "honor artistic achievement, technical proficiency and overall excellence in the recording industry, without regard to album sales or chart position".

The award was first presented to Joe Jackson in 2001. According to the category description guide for the 52nd Grammy Awards, the award is presented to albums containing "at least 51% playing time of newly recorded pop instrumental tracks". As of 2020, Larry Carlton, Booker T. Jones and Snarky Puppy are the only musicians to receive the award more than once. Gerald Albright has received the most nominations, with six.

The award goes to the artist, producer and engineer/mixer of more than 50% of playing time on the winning album. A producer or engineer/mixer who worked on less than 50% of playing time, as well as the mastering engineer, can apply for a Winners Certificate.

In 2015, the category was renamed Best Contemporary Instrumental Album and moved from the Pop category field to the Contemporary category field. The category description did not change.

Recipients

 Each year is linked to the article about the Grammy Awards held that year.
 An award was presented to James R. Jensen as the producer of the album.

See also

 Grammy Award for Best Pop Instrumental Performance
 List of Grammy Award categories

References

General
  Note: User must select the "Pop" category as the genre under the search feature.

Specific

 
Album awards
Awards established in 2001
Contemporary Instrumental Album
Contemporary Instrumental Album